The Licentiate in Music, Australia (LMusA) is a diploma awarded by examination to outstanding candidates in the fields of musical performance and music theory by the Australian Music Examinations Board (AMEB).

AMEB administers music examinations in Australia, and its Licentiate diploma has a national success rate of around 10% of candidates. Typically, a candidate will have already completed AMEB exams up to the Associate diploma level prior to attempting the LMusA, although there is no requirement for this. Above the LMusA is the most prestigious but extremely rare Fellowship in Music, Australia (FMusA).

An LMusA practical examination is conducted by two examiners (one Federal examiner who maintains consistency in the national standard, and one state examiner who is a specialist in the instrument being examined). Candidates must present a repertoire from the prescribed lists of pieces that is 35 minutes, but no more than 50 minutes in length, with a further ten minutes testing musical general knowledge of the pieces presented.  Candidates receive one of three grades at diploma level: "no award", "award", and the exceptional "award with distinction" (very rarely awarded).

Categories 
The LMusA is awarded in these categories:

Theory
Theory of Music in Musicology, Harmony & Counterpoint or Orchestration & Arrangement.

Keyboard
Piano
Organ
Accordion
Electronic Organ

Strings
Violin
Viola
Cello
Double Bass
Classical Guitar
Harp

Woodwind
Recorder
Flute
Oboe
Clarinet
Bassoon
Saxophone

Orchestral Brass
Horn
Trumpet
Trombone
Tuba
Euphonium

Brass Band
Instruments in B flat, E flat and C

Singing
Singing
Musical Theatre

Ensemble Performance
Woodwind
Brass
Percussion
Strings
Mixed Ensemble

References

 2012 Manual of Syllabuses. Australian Music Examinations Board. Victoria, 2011. ISSN 0729-3569

External links
 Australian Music Examinations Board

Performing arts education in Australia
Music education in Oceania
Academic degrees of Australia